Reginald Ben Davis (1907–1998) was a British wildlife artist who contributed many painted pages to Look and Learn and Treasure magazines. Davis also drew comic strips and cover illustrations for girls' comics.

External links
 Lambiek Comiclopedia article.
 Look and Learn Magazine search for R B Davis

British comics artists
British illustrators
Wildlife artists
1907 births
1998 deaths